Joel C. Rosenberg (born April 17, 1967) is an American-Israeli communications strategist, author, and non-profit executive. He has written sixteen novels about terrorism and Bible prophecy, including the Gold Medallion Book Award-winner The Ezekiel Option. He also has written three nonfiction books, Epicenter, Inside the Revolution, and Enemies and Allies.

Early life
Rosenberg was born in 1967 near Rochester, New York. He has stated that his father is of Jewish descent and his mother was born into a Methodist family of English descent. His parents were agnostic and became born-again Christians when he was a child in 1973. At the age of 17, he became a born-again Christian and now identifies as a Jewish believer in Jesus. He graduated in 1988 from Syracuse University, after which he worked for Rush Limbaugh as a research assistant. Later, he worked for U.S. presidential candidate Steve Forbes as a campaign advisor. Rosenberg opened a political consultancy business which he ran until 2000, and claims to have consulted for former Israeli Deputy Prime Minister Natan Sharansky and former Prime Minister Benjamin Netanyahu, where he says that he garnered much of his information on the Middle East that he uses in his books.

Career
Following Netanyahu's loss in 1999, Rosenberg decided to retire from politics and begin a new career in writing. The Last Jihad was both his first book and the first of a five-part fictional series involving terrorism and how it may relate to Bible prophecy. The book was written nine months before the September 11 attacks (a revised edition takes the event into account) and was published in 2002. When published, The Last Jihad spent 11 weeks on the New York Times best-seller list, reaching as high as number seven. It also appeared on the USA Today and Publishers Weekly best-seller lists, and hit number four on The Wall Street Journal list. The book was followed by The Last Days, which spent four weeks on the New York Times Best Seller List, hit number five on the Denver Post list, and hit number eight on the Dallas Morning News list. Following the successes of his first two novels, The Ezekiel Option was published in 2005, The Copper Scroll in 2006, and the final book Dead Heat in 2008.

Rosenberg also wrote a non-fictional account of current events and Bible prophecy in the book Epicenter. It was published in September 2006, and an accompanying DVD was produced in the summer of 2007. His second non-fiction book Inside the Revolution addresses the different sects of Islam in the Middle East and asserts that a significant number of moderate Muslims are converting to Christianity in the region. It was released in 2009 and also made it onto the New York Times best-seller list, reaching as high as #7 as of 27 March 2009. His 2011 book The Twelfth Imam also deals with terrorism and Iran gaining nuclear power.

The Joshua Fund 
Rosenberg is the founder and president of The Joshua Fund, a 501(c)(3) not-for-profit charity that seeks to "Bless Israel and her neighbors in the name of Jesus, according to Genesis 12:1-3."

Criticism
Media Matters for America, a progressive media watchdog group, criticized Rosenberg's July 31, 2006, Paula Zahn Now CNN appearance that "featured a segment on 'whether the crisis in the Middle East is actually a prelude to the end of the world,' marking the third time in eight days that CNN has devoted airtime to those claiming that the ongoing Mideast violence signals the coming of the Apocalypse." It featured Rosenberg comparing apocalyptic Scripture in the Bible to modern events, which he views, in addition to the lenses of politics and economics, through what he calls "a third lens as well: the lens of Scripture."

Rosenberg's views on the War of Ezekiel 38–39 involving Gog and Magog are in line with dispensationalism, one of several Christian theological systems involving eschatology. Partial preterist Gary DeMar has debated Rosenberg on this subject.

Personal life 
Rosenberg and his wife Lynn have four sons: Caleb, Jacob, Jonah and Noah, and reside in Israel.

Bibliography
Fiction

Last Jihad series

The Last Jihad (2002) 
The Last Days (2003) 
The Ezekiel Option (2005) 
The Copper Scroll (2006) 
Dead Heat (2008) 

David Shirazi series

The Twelfth Imam (2010) 
The Tehran Initiative (2011) 
Damascus Countdown (2013) 

J.B. Collins series

The Third Target (2015) 
The First Hostage (2016) 
Without Warning (2017) 

Marcus Ryker series

The Kremlin Conspiracy (2018) 
The Persian Gamble (2019) 
The Jerusalem Assassin (2020) 
The Beirut Protocol (2021) 

Standalone novels

 The Auschwitz Escape (2014) 

Non-fiction

Epicenter (2006) 
Epicenter 2.0 (2008) 
Inside the Revolution (2009) 
Inside the Revival (2010) 
Implosion (2012) 
The Invested Life (2012) 
Israel at War (2012) 
 Enemies and Allies: An Unforgettable Journey Inside the Fast-Moving & Immensely Turbulent Modern Middle East (2021)

References

External links
Joel C. Rosenberg Official Site

1967 births
Living people
21st-century American novelists
American Christian Zionists
American male novelists
American people of Jewish descent
American people of English descent
Christian novelists
New York (state) Republicans
Writers from Rochester, New York
21st-century American male writers
Novelists from New York (state)